Saint-Camille is a township municipality in the Canadian province of Quebec, located within the Les Sources Regional County Municipality. The township had a population of 529 in the Canada 2016 Census.

Demographics 

References

External links

Township municipalities in Quebec
Incorporated places in Estrie